Vidhyarthikale Ithile Ithile is a 1972 Indian Malayalam-language comedy film directed by John Abraham in his debut. It is based on the French film Nous les gosses (1941). The film stars Madhu, Jayabharathi, Adoor Bhasi and Paul Vengola. The film had musical score by M. B. Sreenivasan.

Plot

Cast 

Madhu
Jayabharathi
Adoor Bhasi
Paul Vengola
Manorama
Master Vijayakumar
Paravoor Bharathan
S.V.Ranga Rao
S. P. Pillai
T. K. Balachandran
M. R. R. Vasu

Soundtrack 
The music was composed by M. B. Sreenivasan and the lyrics were written by Vayalar Ramavarma.

References

External links 
 

1970s Malayalam-language films
1972 comedy films
1972 directorial debut films
1972 films
Indian comedy films
Indian remakes of French films
Films based on works by Marcel Aymé